Elections for Kensington and Chelsea London Borough Council were held on 22 May 2014. The United Kingdom element of the 2014 European Parliament election and other local elections took place on the same day.

In London council elections the entire council is elected every four years, opposed to some local elections where one councillor is elected every year for three of the four years.

Summary of results

Reduction in size of council

The Local Government Boundary Commission for England released its final recommendations for changes to the Royal Borough in September 2013, reducing the size of the council to 50 members.

Ward results

|- class="unsortable" align="centre"
!rowspan=2 align="left"|Ward
!Votes
!Cllrs
!Votes
!Cllrs
!Votes
!Cllrs
!Votes
!Cllrs
!Votes
!Cllrs
!rowspan=2|TotalVotes
!rowspan=2|TotalCllrs
|- class="unsortable" align="center"
!colspan=2 bgcolor=""| Conservative
!colspan=2 bgcolor="" | Labour
!colspan=2 bgcolor="" | Lib Dem
!colspan=2 bgcolor="" | Green
!colspan=2 bgcolor="white"| Others
|-
|align="left"|Abingdon
|bgcolor="lightblue"|3682
|bgcolor="lightblue"|3
|704
|0
|344
|0
|236
|0
|
|
|4966
|3
|-
|align="left"|Brompton and Hans Town
|bgcolor="lightblue"|3503
|bgcolor="lightblue"|3
|603
|0
|150
|0
|
|
|147
|0
|4403
|3
|-
|align="left"|Campden
|bgcolor="lightblue"|3933
|bgcolor="lightblue"|3
|704
|0
|281
|0
|
|
|
|
|4918
|3
|-
|align="left"|Chelsea Riverside
|bgcolor="lightblue"|3491
|bgcolor="lightblue"|3
|1950
|0
|389
|0
|
|
|188
|0
|6018
|3
|-
|align="left"|Colville
|1502
|0
|bgcolor="EEA2AD"|2388
|bgcolor="EEA2AD"|3
|1089
|0
|310
|0
|455
|0
|5744
|3
|-
|align="left"|Courtfield
|bgcolor="lightblue"|3393
|bgcolor="lightblue"|3
|740
|0
|446
|0
|
|
|
|
|4579
|3
|-
|align="left"|Dalgarno
|586
|0
|bgcolor="EEA2AD"|1791
|bgcolor="EEA2AD"|2
|196
|0
|
|
|253
|0
|2826
|2
|-
|align="left"|Earl's Court
|bgcolor="lightblue"|2714
|bgcolor="lightblue"|2
|1004
|0
|bgcolor="EFE146"|1279
|bgcolor="EFE146"|1
|327
|0
|
|
|5324
|3
|-
|align="left"|Golborne 
|736
|0
|bgcolor="EEA2AD"|3551
|bgcolor="EEA2AD"|3
|182
|0
|
|
|117
|0
|4586
|3
|-
|align="left"|Holland
|bgcolor="lightblue"|2965
|bgcolor="lightblue"|3
|961
|0
|452
|0
|
|
|
|
|4378
|3
|-
|align="left"|Norland
|bgcolor="lightblue"|1970
|bgcolor="lightblue"|2
|636
|0
|287
|0
|
|
|
|
|2893
|2
|-
|align="left"|Notting Dale 
|1391
|0
|bgcolor="EEA2AD"|4132
|bgcolor="EEA2AD"|3
|
|
|
|
|
|
|5523
|3
|-
|align="left"|Pembridge
|bgcolor="lightblue"|1517
|bgcolor="lightblue"|2
|515
|0
|306
|0
|
|
|
|
|2338
|2
|-
|align="left"|Queen's Gate
|bgcolor="lightblue"|3233
|bgcolor="lightblue"|3
|345
|0
|369
|0
|
|
|
|
|3947
|3
|-
|align="left"|Redcliffe
|bgcolor="lightblue"|3482
|bgcolor="lightblue"|3
|577
|0
|375
|0
|
|
|168
|0
|4602
|3
|-
|align="left"|Royal Hospital
|bgcolor="lightblue"|4659
|bgcolor="lightblue"|3
|611
|0
|333
|0
|
|
|164
|0
|5767
|3
|-
|align="left"|St Helen's
|bgcolor="lightblue"|1306
|bgcolor="lightblue"|1
|bgcolor="EEA2AD"|1323
|bgcolor="EEA2AD"|1
|258
|0
|
|
|
|
|2887
|2
|-
|align="left"|Stanley
|bgcolor="lightblue"|3928
|bgcolor="lightblue"|3
|848
|0
|
|
|
|
|1376
|0
|6152
|3
|- class="unsortable" class="sortbottom" style="background:#C9C9C9"
|align="left"| Total
|bgcolor="lightblue"|47,991
|bgcolor="lightblue"|37
|bgcolor="EEA2AD"|23,845
|bgcolor="EEA2AD"|12
|bgcolor="EFE146"|7,154
|bgcolor="EFE146"|1
|1,133
|0
|2,868
|0
|81851
|50
|-
|}

Abingdon

Brompton and Hans Town

Campden

Chelsea Riverside

Colville

Courtfield

Dalgarno

Earl’s Court

Golborne

Holland

Norland

Notting Dale

Pembridge

Queen’s Gate

Redcliffe

Royal Hospital

St Helen’s

Stanley

References

2014
Kensington and Chelsea
21st century in the Royal Borough of Kensington and Chelsea